The 2013 World Junior Short Track Speed Skating Championships took place from 22 to 24 February 2013 in Warsaw, Poland at the Torwar Hall. The World Championships are organised by the ISU which also run world cups and championships in speed skating and figure skating.

Medal summary

Medal table

Men's events
The results of the Championships:

Women's events

Participating nations
191 athletes from 39 countries participated in these championships, which is an increase of eleven nations and 61 athletes from the last year's competition.

See also
Short track speed skating
World Junior Short Track Speed Skating Championships

References

External links
Official website
Results book

World Junior Short Track Speed Skating Championships
World Junior Short Track Speed Skating Championships
World Junior Short Track Speed Skating Championships
International speed skating competitions hosted by Poland
Sports competitions in Warsaw
2010s in Warsaw
World Junior Short Track Speed Skating Championships
World Junior Short Track Speed Skating